Faith TV was a Christian movie, documentary and biography channel featuring drama, comedy, action, and educational programs and feature films drawn from inspirational media libraries. It was replaced by My Family TV.

Programming
Some examples of the biographies Faith TV has aired are Martin Luther, History of Christianity, and Christian Heroes of the Bible. Documentaries have included Wings over the World, Rail Away, Hollywood First and Last, and Giotto: His Life and Art. Movies have included Souls in Conflict, Father’s Little Dividend, and The Bishop’s Wife.  And among the family programs that have aired are Nanna's Cottage, You Bet Your Life with Groucho Marx, Dusty's Trail with Bob Denver (Gilligan's Island) and the Adam and Eve Factor Christian marriage series.

Availability
Faith TV was seen across the nation on the Sky Angel IPTV service.

Channel objectives
The specific objectives of Faith TV were:

 Improve individuals, families, society and civilization by promoting Godly values
 Bring "seekers" to a saving knowledge of Jesus Christ
 Provide lifelong educational opportunities for Christian learners
 Expand the reach of Christian institutions of higher learning
 Influence our culture by presenting education based on a Christ-centered world-view
 Provide strategic content partners added value for their product and help them fulfill their mission
 Help expand the reach of the satellite distribution partner
 Help expand the ministry of affiliated stations and cable programmers
 Become a financially successful television programming network
 Become a distribution platform for new and creative programming

External links
Faith TV 
Sky Angel Satellite Network 

Religious television stations in the United States